Utah State Correctional Facility (USCF) is one of two prisons managed by the Utah Department of Corrections' Division of Institutional Operations. It is located in the northwestern corner of Salt Lake City, Utah, United States. It replaced the former Utah State Prison in July 2022.

Description

The large prison complex houses both male and female prisoners in separate facilities. These facilities range from minimum security to supermax. Upon opening, 2,464 inmates were transferred from the former Utah State Prison. The Bear Facility houses men's general population, the Antelope Facility houses restricted men's population, the Currant Facility houses men's geriatric and mental health population, and the Dell Facility houses female inmates.

History
The former Utah State Prison was built in Draper in 1951. Since the former prison's erection, business parks and residential neighborhoods have developed the once rural area into a suburban one. Seeking the ability to offer better treatment option state legislature initiated a process to build a new prison, deciding it was best to relocate elsewhere. A study was completed in 2005 by Wikstrom Economic & Planning Consultants to determine if moving the prison would be feasible. The test of feasibility was whether or not the value of the real estate of the current location could support the cost of relocation. It was determined that the cost of relocating the prison far exceeded the value that could be realized from the sale of the Draper prison site. However, on August 19, 2015, a special session of the state legislature voted to move the prison to the northwest side of Salt Lake City.

The new facility was completed and the inmates from the former prison were transferred July 11–15, 2022. The former prison officially closed July 15, 2022.

See also

 List of Utah state prisons
 Capital punishment in Utah

References

External links

 Official site at the Utah Department of Corrections

Prisons in Utah
Women's prisons in the United States
Buildings and structures in Salt Lake City
Supermax prisons
Execution sites in the United States
2022 establishments in Utah